The 6.5×52mm Carcano, also known as the 6.5×52mm Parravicini–Carcano or 6.5×52mm Mannlicher–Carcano, is an Italian military 6.5 mm (.268 cal, actually 0.2675 inches) rimless bottle-necked rifle cartridge, developed from 1889 to 1891 and used in the Carcano 1891 rifle and many of its successors. A common synonym in American gun literature is "6.5mm Italian." In American parlance, "Carcano" is frequently added to better distinguish it from the rimmed hunting cartridge 6.5×52mmR (U.S. version: .25-35 Winchester). Ballistically, its performance is very similar to that of the 6.5×54mm Mannlicher–Schönauer.

Design 
Under the direction of the Commissione delle Armi Portatili (commission for portable weapons), instituted in 1888, to develop a smokeless-powder rifle for the Italian Army, the Reale Laboratorio Pirotecnico di Bologna (royal pyrotechnical laboratory of Bologna) developed and tried several different cartridge designs, with bullet diameters from 6 to 8mm. Finally, due also to the influence of Major Antonio Benedetti of the Brescia Arsenal, secretary of the commission and strong supporter of the advantages of smallbore cartridges, the 6.5×52 cartridge was adopted in March 1890, prior to the adoption of the rifle that used it (the Model 1891 Carcano rifle).

After the adoption of the cartridge, the arsenal's technicians worried about the characteristics of the original ballistite load, since that propellant was considered too erosive (flame temperature of 3,000-3,500 °C) and not stable under severe climatic conditions. Several other loads were tested, including the British cordite, but without good results, until the Reale Polverificio del Liri (royal explosives factory of Liri) developed a new propellant called "Solenite," composed of trinitrocellulose (40%), dinitrocellulose (21%), nitroglycerine (36%) and mineral oil (3%), and shaped in large tube-like grains. The new propellant reduced the flame temperatures to 2,600 °C and proved to be very stable, and was adopted in 1896 and never changed until the end of the military production of the cartridge.

The 6.5×52mm Carcano was designed as an infantry cartridge. In accordance with the tactics of the time, the adjustable rear sight of the rifle allowed for volley fire up to 2,000 metres. The 6.5×52mm Carcano was the first to be officially adopted of a class of similar smallbore military rifle cartridges which included the 6.5×50mm Arisaka (Japan), 6.5×53mmR Mannlicher (Romania/Netherlands), 6.5×54mm Mannlicher–Schönauer (Greece), 6.5×55mm Swedish Mauser (also Norwegian Krag–Jørgensen), and the Portuguese 6.5×58mm Vergueiro.

A comparison with larger-bore smokeless powder cartridges of the 7 and 8 mm calibre class (such as the French 8×50mmR Lebel, the German 7.92×57mm, the Austrian 8×50mmR Mannlicher, the .303 British, the Russian 7.62×54mmR, the Belgian and 7.65×53mm Argentine, the American .30-40 Krag, and the much later .30-03 and .30-06 Springfield) may make the 6.5mm rounds appear underpowered on paper, and lacking in stopping power. However, the small bore cartridges have a long list of advantages, such as flatness of trajectory, outstanding penetration at distance, less weight, less recoil, smaller dimensions, and less material required in production.

Its short-lived intended successor cartridge, the 7.35×51mm Carcano, was designed to replace the 6.5mm Carcano, but those plans were cancelled due to the logistic difficulties that arose once World War II commenced.

The original 6.5×52mm barrel design, developed by the Brescia Arsenal at the same time as the cartridge before development of the M91 Carcano rifle itself, used a gain twist barrel with deep rifling to reduce wear and give consistent accuracy.  A gain twist has a slow initial twist in the barrel, progressively getting faster until the final twist rate is attained near the muzzle, resulting in less torque being imparted to the bullet during the highest stress phase of the interior ballistic cycle, and thus less wear in the throat of the barrel. Gain twist was phased out in the last production of the Carcano rifle in favour of conventional rifling.

Performance 

The cartridge is acceptable, with proper bullet, for medium-size big game such as North American whitetail deer within 250 yards. However, the standard Italian service round used an unstable round-nosed bullet with a propensity to tumble, whether hitting soft tissue/ballistic gel or harder material such as bone.

The much maligned cartridge suffered a PR nightmare since it was used in the JFK assassination by Lee Harvey Oswald.  Dubbed the humanitarian by members of the Warren Commission, due to perceived deficits in quality and performance, it has never enjoyed more than a cult following by collectors and historians.  Rather, it has been found that the cartridge is indeed accurate  and the rifles were well constructed.  Cartridge developers and experimental handloaders such as P.O. Ackley found the rifle was able to handle excess pressure, with even Ackley's abuse "unable to break the action." A testament to the quality of the rifle and the cartridge.

The currently available factory ammunition may lack accuracy due to the use of a 6.7mm (.264 in) bullet instead of the 6.8mm (.267 in) as originally loaded.  While manufacturers do sell equipment to size the neck of the cartridge case to .267, as of 2022, only one .267 option is available for handloaders.  Prvi Partizan, of Serbia, manufactures a 139 gr. FMJ bullet both as a component and factory produced ammunition.  Hornady produced a 160 gr. FMJ bullet until recently, but has since discontinued production.

The standard military cartridge and the currently available Prvi Partizan can be duplicated using modern smokeless powders branded by Hodgdon such as  H 4831, H4064, and IMR 4895.  Data includes options for .264 and .267 sized projectiles.  Appropriate sized bullets (.267-.268 in.)  would have to be hand cast using bullet moulds.  None of the major manufacturers currently (as of 2022) list the appropriate sized projectile in their catalogs.  Rare and expensive legacy moulds could be available on the second-hand market.

In the JFK assassination 

The cartridge was identified by the Warren Commission as the round used in a World War II-surplus Italian 1891 Carcano (Fucile di Fanteria Mod. 91/38) rifle used by Lee Harvey Oswald at the Texas School Book Depository to assassinate United States President John F. Kennedy at Dealey Plaza in Dallas, Texas on November 22, 1963.

Users 
 
 (1861-1946)
 (1943-1945)
 Albania
 Ethiopia
 Greece

Lee Harvey Oswald

See also 
 List of rifle cartridges
 6 mm caliber
 Table of handgun and rifle cartridges

References 
 www.il91.it
 G.Simone, R. Belogi, A. Grimaldi, "Il 91", Ravizza (1970)

External links 
 6,5 x 52 Mannlicher - Carcano 

6.5x52mm Carcano
Military cartridges